"Will It Go Round in Circles" is a song by American soul musician Billy Preston from his 1972 album Music Is My Life. It was written by Preston and Bruce Fisher and released as a single in March 1973. The record topped the Billboard Hot 100 and sold over a million copies.  This was the first of two number one hits for Preston as a solo performer, the other being "Nothing from Nothing", although he is also credited on the Beatles' 1969 hit "Get Back".

Personnel 
Source:

 Billy Preston – keyboards, bass guitar, vocals
 George Johnson – guitar
 Louis Johnson – bass guitar
 Hubert Heard – keyboards
 Manuel Kellough – drums
 Tom Scott – horn
 Jim Horn – horn
 George Bohanon – horn
 Buck Monari – horn
 Paul Hubinon – horn

Chart performance

Weekly charts

Year-end charts

All-time charts

Covers
The song was covered by Donny Osmond on his 2009 album Love Songs Of The '70s. Phish did two renditions in 1999, including on 10 September at The Gorge Amphitheatre. Orlando Brown recorded it for the 2006 soundtrack album That's So Raven Too!, for his Disney Channel series That's So Raven; his version was also featured in the Disney Channel original film Wendy Wu: Homecoming Warrior. The song was performed in Hebrew by Yehonatan Geffen and Dani Litani in their 1974 live show That's All for Now - For Now That's All.

In popular culture
 Appearance in the soundtrack of the 1996 Matt Dillon film Beautiful Girls.
 Featured as the opening theme in the 1997 HBO Sports documentary Long Shots: The life and times of the American Basketball Association.

References

External links
 

1973 singles
Billy Preston songs
Billboard Hot 100 number-one singles
Cashbox number-one singles
Songs written by Billy Preston
Songs written by Bruce Fisher
Ringo Starr songs
1972 songs
A&M Records singles